"You Got Me" is a song recorded by American singer Mya. It was written by Sydnii Raymor and Mya, while production was helmed by Lamar "Mars" Edwards. A "sexy, sultry" millennial slow jam similar to "Ready for Whatever" (2017), "You Got Me," is a blend of steady drums and sensual synths reminiscent of 90's R&B featuring Harrison's signature breathy coos. Released February 14, 2018, "You Got Me" serves as the third single from TKO (The Knock Out) and commemorates the twentieth anniversary of her debut single "It's All About Me."

Background
As tradition, on February 14, 2016, Mya released her seventh studio album Smoove Jones (2016) to commemorate the release of her debut single "It's All About Me" and eighteenth anniversary in the entertainment industry. The release paid homage to R&B/soul/hip-hop with old school elements from the 1970s, 1980s, and 1990s and was released exclusively through Apple Music. Critically, Smoove Jones received "generally favourable" reviews from music critics. In 2017, Smoove Jones received a nomination for Best R&B Album at the 59th Annual Grammy Awards, which were held on February 12, 2017. Two days later, as a gift to her fans and commemorating her nineteenth anniversary, Mýa released a music video for the fan favorite "Coolin'". Filmed in Sydney, Australia, director Matt Sharp captures the singer's unmistakable beauty while she lets her vocals do the rest on a sandy beach.

In late 2017, Mýa released the first single from the forthcoming studio album, Ready for Whatever on September 22, 2017. A music video for "Ready for Whatever" was produced and directed by Mýa co-starring R&B singer Kevin McCall as her love interest.  Less than two months, its follow up single and sequel, Ready, Part II was released on November 24, 2017. The song paid homage to R.Kelly's It Seems Like You're Ready.

Composition
"You Got Me" is a song written by Mýa and Sydnii Raymor while production was handled by Lamar "MyGuyMars" Edwards. Described as a sexy, sultry slow jam, "You Got Me" features a combination of steady drums, sensual synths reminiscent of 90's R&B and finger snapping with Harrison's signature breathy coos. Lyrically, the song embraces that sentiment painting a vivid image of love making with straightforward lyrics and a serene voice.

Music video
Shot in Glendale, California, the simple, sexy, and energetic visual features Mýa seducing her love interest dressed in athletic attire at a dance studio equipped with mirrors that is reminiscent of the '80s fitness craze. Subsequently, Mýa turns up the heat when she's joined by her two female dancers.

Personnel
Credits adapted from Qobuz.

Mýa – vocals, songwriting
Sydnii Raymore – songwriting
Lamar "Mars" Edwards – composer

Release history

References

2018 singles
2018 songs
Mýa songs
Songs written by Mýa